Agromyces marinus is a Gram-negative bacterium from the genus of Agromyces which has been isolated from marine sediments from the beach of Kamogawa in Japan.

References 

Microbacteriaceae
Bacteria described in 2015